The Prince Olav Mountains is a mountain range of the Queen Maud Mountains in Antarctica stretching from Shackleton Glacier to Liv Glacier at the head of the Ross Ice Shelf.

Discovered in 1911 by Roald Amundsen on the way to the South Pole, and named by him for the then Crown Prince Olav of Norway.

Key mountains 
This range includes the following mountains and peaks:

Allaire Peak 
Named by Advisory Committee on Antarctic Names (US-ACAN) for Captain C.J. Allaire, USA, on the Staff of the Commander, U.S. Naval Support Force, Antarctica, during U.S. Navy Operation Deep Freeze 1963.

Mount Campbell 
Discovered and photographed by the USAS (1939–41), and surveyed by A.P. Crary (1957–58). Named by Crary for Joel Campbell of the U.S. Coast and Geodetic Survey, Antarctic Project Leader for geomagnetic operations, 1957-60.

Centennial Peak 
Mapped by USGS from surveys and U.S. Navy air photos 1960-65. Named by US-ACAN in recognition of the Centennial of Ohio State University in 1970, the same year the University's Institute of Polar Studies celebrated its Decennial. The University and the Institute have been very active in Antarctic investigations since 1960.

Mount Finley 
Named by Rear Admiral Byrd for John H. Finley, President of the American Geographical Society at the time of the Byrd Antarctic Expedition, 1928-30.

Mount Fisher 
Discovered and photographed by Byrd on flights to the Queen Maud Mountains in November 1929, and named by him for the Fisher brothers, Detroit industrialists and contributors to the Byrd Antarctic Expedition, 1928-30.

Jones Peak 
Jones Peak is a mainly ice-free peak standing  WNW of Mount Fisher at the head of DeGanahl Glacier. Named by Advisory Committee on Antarctic Names (US-ACAN) for John M. Jones, Program Officer of the Committee on Polar Research, United States National Academy of Sciences, 1957-1963.

Mount Oliver 
Discovered and photographed by the USAS, 1939-41. Surveyed by A.P. Crary (1957–58) and named by him for Norman Oliver, Air Force Cambridge Research Center, who was Antarctic Project Leader for aurora operations, 1957-60.

Mount Ray 
Named by US-ACAN for Carleton Ray, USARP zoologist at McMurdo Station in the 1963-64, 1964–65, and 1965–66 summer seasons.

Mount Sellery 
Mount Sellery is a prominent peak between Mount Oliver and Mount Smithson. Discovered and photographed by Byrd on the Baselaying Flight of November 18, 1929, and surveyed by A.P. Crary in 1957-58. The mountain is named by Crary for Harry Sellery of the U.S. National Bureau of Standards, who was Antarctic Project Leader for ionosphere studies, 1957-60.

Mount Smithson 
Mount Smithson is a mountain over 3,000 m along the northern escarpment of the Prince Olav Mountains, standing 3 mi E of Mount Sellery between the heads of Krout and Harwell Glaciers. Named by US-ACAN for James Smithson, English philanthropist. In 1835, his property came into the possession of the United States Government, having been bequeathed by him for the purpose of founding an institution at Washington, DC, to be called the Smithsonian Institution for the increase and diffusion of knowledge among men.

Features
Geographical features include:

 Allaire Peak
 Barrett Glacier
 Cape Irwyn
 Centennial Peak
 Clark Spur
 Gough Glacier
 Hardiman Peak
 Harwell Glacier
 Holzrichter Glacier
 Jones Peak
 Krout Glacier
 Longhorn Spurs
 McGregor Glacier
 Mercik Peak
 Mount Campbell
 Mount Dodge
 Mount Finley
 Mount Fisher
 Mount Hall
 Mount Kenney
 Mount Krebs
 Mount Llano
 Mount McCue
 Mount Munson
 Mount Oliver
 Mount Ray
 Mount Roe
 Mount Sellery
 Mount Smithson
 Mount Wade
 Mount Wells
 Mount Wendland
 Watt Ridge
 Zotikov Glacier

References

Queen Maud Mountains
Mountain ranges of the Ross Dependency
Dufek Coast